An isthmus is a strip of land connecting two larger bodies of land.

Isthmus may also refer to:

Isthmus (album), a 2022 album by Irish musician Seamus O'Muineachain
Isthmus (Cos), an ancient town on the Greek island of Cos
Isthmus (newspaper), a monthly newspaper in Madison, Wisconsin
An anatomically narrow part of an organ; see List of anatomical isthmi
The visible medial third of the uterine tube is the isthmus of uterine tube or isthmus tubae uterinae
An edge in a graph whose deletion increases the number of connected components of the graph; see Bridge (graph theory)
A fictional banana republic in the James Bond film Licence to Kill

See also
 List of isthmuses